Teege is a surname. Notable people with the surname include:

 Jennifer Teege (born 1970), German writer
 Joachim Teege (1925–1969), German actor

See also
 Teele

German-language surnames